A Monster Calls is a 2016 dark fantasy drama film directed by J. A. Bayona from a screenplay by Patrick Ness and based on Ness' 2011 novel of the same name. It stars Sigourney Weaver, Felicity Jones, Toby Kebbell, Lewis MacDougall, and Liam Neeson. In the film, Conor O'Malley (MacDougall) grapples with his mother's terminal illness as he is visited by the Monster (Neeson), a giant anthropomorphic yew tree who tells him stories. 

The film rights to Ness' novel were acquired by Focus Features in March 2014, after which, he was hired as screenwriter and Bayona signed on as director. Jones was first hired that April and Neeson joined that May, with the rest of the main cast rounded out by that September. Principal photography began on 30 September 2014, with filming locations mainly including West Yorkshire, Derbyshire and Lancashire in England, with additional scenes filmed on location in Spain.

A Monster Calls premiered at the 2016 Toronto International Film Festival on 10 September 2016 and was theatrically released first in Spain on 7 October by Universal Pictures, in the United Kingdom by Entertainment One on 1 January 2017, and in the United States five days later. The film received positive reviews from critics, with praise for Bayona's direction, acting performances, visual effects, and its thematic content. It underperformed at the box office, grossing $47 million worldwide.

Plot

12-year-old Conor O'Malley has a close bond with his seriously ill mother and maintains the household during her regular chemotherapy treatments at the hospital. His grandmother often visits, and suggests he come live with her in the event of his mother's death. Conor doesn't warm to her due to her coldness.

At school, he is regularly tormented by his classmate Harry. He is also plagued by a nightmare in which the old church near his house collapses into a hole, where he tries to prevent his mum from plummeting to her death by trying to hold onto them. Conor vents his emotions by drawing, a talent inherited from his mother.

One night at exactly seven minutes past midnight, he sees the large yew tree next to the church transform into a gnarled Monster that approaches his home. The Monster says it will tell Conor three stories during their next meetings, after which Conor must tell the Monster a fourth tale in return.

In the Monster's first story, a prince escapes from his stepgrandmother, the supposedly evil queen. He then kills his sleeping bride under a yew tree and makes the queen the scapegoat so the people drive her away and make him king.

As Conor's mother worsens, he moves in with his grandmother. In the evening, Conor summons the Monster by forcing the hands of the clock to show 12:07. He appears, and tells the second story. In the tale, a hard-hearted parson forbids an apothecary from extracting medicine from an old yew tree, only to rescind this measure when his own children become ill. The apothecary refuses to help him, and the Monster begins to destroy the parson's house as punishment. Conor enthusiastically joins in on the destruction, but he suddenly finds he has angrily destroyed his grandmother's sitting room and valuable grandfather clock instead. His grandmother, while shocked and upset, does not punish Conor.

The doctors turn to a final treatment involving yew wood. Conor implores the Monster to heal his mother, only for the Monster to dismiss the matter as outside of his responsibility. At school, Harry tells Conor he will no longer bother him because he "no longer sees [him]". The Monster tells the third story of an invisible man who did not want to be so. Conor angrily attacks Harry, hospitalizing him. To his surprise, the headmistress refrains from punishing him as she comprehends his current home situation.

When it becomes clear his mother will die, Conor runs to the yew tree, where the Monster forces him to relive his recurring nightmare. This time we see it's his mother dangling for her life over a precipice, holding onto Conor's hand. He slowly loses his grip until his mother disappears into the enormous sinkhole. The monster then confronts Conor and repeatedly demands he tell his fourth tale, as it's the only way for him to be set free. Conor pleads not to, believing that the truth would kill him.

Eventually, Conor admits that he had long suspected his mother would not survive and secretly hoped she would die to end their suffering, although at the same time he did not want her to die. In his recurring nightmare, he subconsciously lets go of his mother's hand, which fills him with guilt. The Monster commends Conor for his bravery in telling the truth and tells him it's human to feel the way he did.

Conor's grandmother finds him asleep under the yew tree and drives to the hospital where the mother is about to die. Conor embraces his mother, and she glances at the Monster and dies at exactly seven minutes past midnight. Conor returns to his grandmother's house, where his mother's old room has been refurbished for him. There he finds his mother's childhood art book, which depicts the stories that were told to him by the Monster, and a drawing of his mother as a child on the Monster's shoulder.

Cast
 Lewis MacDougall as Conor O'Malley
 Max Golds as 5-year-old Conor
 Liam Neeson as the "Monster" (voice and motion capture), a giant humanoid yew tree.
 Neeson also appears uncredited in a photograph as Conor's grandfather.
 Tom Holland served as the stand-in for the Monster during one week of production.
 Sigourney Weaver as Mrs. Clayton (credited as "Grandma"), Conor’s strict grandmother who has a tense relationship with him.
 Felicity Jones as Elisabeth "Lizzie" Clayton (credited as "Mom"), Conor’s mother who is diagnosed with an unspecified terminal illness.
 Toby Kebbell as Liam O'Malley (credited as "Dad"), Conor’s father who is divorced from Lizzie and now lives in the United States.
 James Melville as Harry, a school bully who frequently targets Conor.
 Geraldine Chaplin as the head teacher of Conor’s school.

Production
Focus Features bought the rights to the book in March 2014. Patrick Ness, the book's author, served as the film's screenwriter, with J. A. Bayona hired as director. On 23 April 2014, Felicity Jones joined the film to play the boy's mother. On 8 May, Liam Neeson was cast to voice the Monster, and on 18 August, Sigourney Weaver joined to play the boy's grandmother. On August 19, Toby Kebbell was also cast in the film. On 3 September, author Ness tweeted that Lewis MacDougall had been set for one of the lead roles as the boy in the film. On 30 September, Geraldine Chaplin joined the cast.

Filming
Principal photography began on 30 September 2014, in Spain and Britain. On 9 October, the filming began on location in Glossop, Preston, Lancashire (Ramsbottom), Rivington Pike (Chorley/Horwich), Blackpool Pleasure Beach, and Marsden, West Yorkshire.

Liam Neeson, who voices the titular tree creature, was not on set throughout the shooting process, and completed his motion-capture performance during a two-week period beforehand, with MacDougall in the room. Actor Tom Holland, who worked with Bayona on The Impossible, worked on set as The Monster on a week when Neeson was absent.

Release
The film was originally scheduled for an October 2016 release. It was rescheduled for a limited roll out on 23 December 2016, followed by a wide release on 6 January 2017. The film was released in the United Kingdom on 1 January 2017, by Entertainment One and Lionsgate, and in India on 6 January 2017, by B4U Relativity.

Reception

Box office
A Monster Calls grossed $3.7 million in the United States and Canada and $43.5 million in other territories for a worldwide total of $47.2 million, against a production budget of $43 million.

In North America, the film had its wide release alongside the opening of Underworld: Blood Wars and the wide expansions of Hidden Figures and Lion, and was initially expected to gross around $10 million from 1,523 theaters over the weekend. However, after making just $659,000 on its first day, weekend projections were lowered to $2 million, which it ended up grossing, finishing 13th at the box office. In its second weekend of wide release it grossed $537,262 (a drop of 74.2%) and in its third week made just $19,080 (a drop of 96.4%) after being pulled from all but 42 theaters, one of the biggest third week theater drops in history.

Critical response
The aggregate site Rotten Tomatoes gives the film an approval rating of 86% based on 266 reviews, and an average rating of 7.6/10. The site's critical consensus reads, "A Monster Calls deftly balances dark themes and fantastical elements to deliver an engrossing and uncommonly moving entry in the crowded coming-of-age genre." At Metacritic, the film has a weighted average score of 76 out of 100, based on 40 critics, indicating "generally favorable reviews". Audiences polled by CinemaScore gave the film an average grade of "A" on an A+ to F scale.

Accolades

See also
 I Kill Giants

References

External links
 
 
 
 
 Official screenplay

2016 films
2010s fantasy drama films
2010s monster movies
Spanish fantasy drama films
British fantasy drama films
Dark fantasy films
2010s English-language films
English-language Spanish films
Films about bullying
Films about death
Films about trees
Films based on American novels
Films based on British novels
Films based on fantasy novels
Films directed by J. A. Bayona
Films shot in Lancashire
Films shot in Yorkshire
Films using motion capture
Participant (company) films
Films with live action and animation
Giant monster films
Films scored by Fernando Velázquez
2016 drama films
Films produced by Álvaro Augustin
Films produced by Ghislain Barrois
Films with screenplays by Patrick Ness
Magic realism films
Films shot in Greater Manchester
2010s British films
2010s Spanish films
2010s American films
Spanish dark fantasy films